Luke Coddington (born 6 June 1995) is an English former professional footballer who played as a goalkeeper.

Career

Middlesbrough
Coddington signed for Middlesbrough as a youth at the age of nine. After spending a month on loan at Guisborough Town in 2014, Coddington was released in 2016.

Huddersfield Town
After his release, Coddington signed for then Championship club Huddersfield Town as a free agent.

Loan to Wrexham
In 2016, Coddington joined Wrexham on a month-long loan as cover for injured goalkeepers Chris Dunn and Shwan Jalal.

Northampton Town
In 2017, Coddington joined League One club Northampton Town on a free transfer, signing a two-year deal with the club. He made his debut in a 4–1 home defeat to Peterborough United.

Return to Wrexham
In September 2017, Coddington re-joined Wrexham, again on a month-long loan. He returned to Northampton in October, remaining unbeaten in his five games for Wrexham.

He was one of eight players released by Northampton at the end of the 2018–19 season.

Chesterfield
In June 2019 Coddington signed a two-year contract with National League side Chesterfield. He was released at the end of his contract and retired shortly afterwards.

International career
Coddington has represented England at under-17, under-18 and under-19 level.

Personal life
Coddington's grandfather, John Coddington, was also a professional footballer who played as a defender, who captained Huddersfield Town in the 1960s. His father, Matthew, was also a goalkeeper at Middlesbrough, however never made a first team appearance.

Coddington retired from football in May 2021 following a serious knee injury he suffered two years earlier. Following his retirement he began training as an engineering apprentice.

Career statistics

References

1995 births
Living people
People from Middlesbrough
Association football goalkeepers
England youth international footballers
Middlesbrough F.C. players
Guisborough Town F.C. players
Huddersfield Town A.F.C. players
Wrexham A.F.C. players
Northampton Town F.C. players
Guiseley A.F.C. players
English Football League players
National League (English football) players
English footballers